Wahid or Waheed is an Arabic masculine given name, meaning  "One", "Absolute One". Al-Wahid is one of the 99 names of Allah.

Given name
 Waheed Akhtar (1934–1996), 
 Waheed Alli, Baron Alli (born 1964), British multimillionaire media entrepreneur and politician
 Waheed Arian (born 1983), British doctor and radiologist, born in Afghanistan
 Mohammed Waheed Hassan (born 1953), political figure
 Wahid Hasyim (1914–1953), first Minister of Religious Affairs, Indonesia

 Waheed Murad (1938–1983), producer, writer, and protagonist of many film musicals
 Waheed Muzdha (1953–2019), Afghan political analyst, writer and a peace activist
 Wahid Omar (born 1978), Afghan politician
 Waheed Qureshi (1925–2009), Pakistani linguist, literary critic, educationalist and scholar 
 Wahid Baksh Sial Rabbani (1910–1995), saint in the Chishti order of Sufis

Surname
 Abdul Wahid (disambiguation), several people
 Abdurrahman Wahid (1940–2009), 4th President of Indonesia
 Habib Wahid (born 1979), Bangladeshi composer and musician
 Hidayat Nur Wahid (born 1960), leader of Indonesia's Constitutional Assembly
 Naushad Waheed (born 1962), Maldivian cartoonist and painter
Nayyirah Waheed, American poet
 Rezia Wahid (born 1975), British textile artist
 Yenny Wahid (born 1974), Indonesian Islamic activist and politician

See also
 Waĥeed, a character in the 1975 film A Girl Named Mahmoud
 Wahid (horse), New Zealand Derby winning racehorse
 Wahid, Phagwara, a village in Phagwara Tehsil, Kapurthala district, Punjab, India
 The Wahid Institute, an Indonesian research center on Islam
 Vahid, Bosnian, Turkish and Persian variant